Ancient Africa is an album by Abdullah Ibrahim, recorded in concert in 1972.

Recording and music
The album was recorded in concert at Jazzhus Montmartre in Copenhagen, in June 1972. The material is a long medley of originals played on the piano, with an encore played on the flute.

Release and reception

Ancient Africa was released on LP in 1974 by JAPO Records, part of ECM Records. A reviewer for ECM commented that, "As with so much of Ibrahim's output, an underlying propulsion lends sanctity to the overarching message."

Track listing
"Bra Joe from Kilimanjaro/Mamma/Tokai/Llanga/Cherry/African Sun" – 23:05
"African Sun [Continued]/Tintinyana/Xaba/Peace – Salaam/Air" – 21:55

Personnel
Abdullah Ibrahim – piano, flute

References

Abdullah Ibrahim albums
Solo piano jazz albums
1974 albums